Ladies' Home Journal was an American magazine last published by the Meredith Corporation. It was first published on February 16, 1883, and eventually became one of the leading women's magazines of the 20th century in the United States. In 1891, it was published in Philadelphia by the Curtis Publishing Company. In 1903, it was the first American magazine to reach one million subscribers.

In the late 20th century, changing tastes and competition from television caused it to lose circulation. Sales of the magazine declined as the publishing company struggled. On April 24, 2014, Meredith announced it would stop publishing the magazine as a monthly with the July issue, stating it was "transitioning Ladies' Home Journal to a special interest publication". It was then available quarterly on newsstands only, though its website remained in operation. The last issue was published in 2016.

Ladies' Home Journal was one of the Seven Sisters, as a group of women's service magazines were known. The name was derived from the Greek myth of the "seven sisters", also known as the Pleiades.

Early history

The Ladies' Home Journal was developed from a popular double-page supplement in the American newspaper Tribune and Farmer titled Women at Home.  Women at Home was written by Louisa Knapp Curtis, wife of the paper's publisher Cyrus H. K. Curtis. After a year it became an independent publication, with Knapp as editor for the first six years. Its original name was The Ladies' Home Journal and Practical Housekeeper, but Knapp dropped the last three words in 1886. 

Knapp continued as the magazine's editor till Edward William Bok succeeded her as LHJ editor in late 1889. Knapp remained involved with the magazine's management, and she also wrote a column for each issue. In 1892, LHJ became the first magazine to refuse patent medicine advertisements. In 1896, Bok became Louisa Knapp's son-in-law when he married her daughter, Mary Louise Curtis. LHJ rapidly became the leading American magazine of its type, reaching a subscribed circulation of more than one million copies by 1903, the first American magazine to do so. 

Edward W. Bok took over the editorship in late 1889, serving until 1919.  Among features he introduced was the popular "Ruth Ashmore advice column" written by Isabel Mallon.  At the turn of the 20th century, the magazine published the work of muckrakers and social reformers such as Jane Addams. In 1901 it published two articles highlighting the early architectural designs of Frank Lloyd Wright.  The December 1909 issue included a comic strip which was the first appearance of Kewpie, created by Rose O'Neill.

Bok introduced business practices at the Ladies' Home Journal that contributed to its success: low subscription rates, inclusion of advertising to off-set costs, and reliance on popular content. This operating structure was adopted by men's magazines like McClure's and Munsey's roughly a decade after it had become the standard practice of American women's magazines.  Scholars argue that women's magazines, like the Ladies' Home Journal, pioneered these strategies "magazine revolution".

There was also a controversial aspect to the magazine during Edward Bok's tenure. He authored more than twenty articles opposed to women's suffrage which threatened his "vision of the woman at home, living the simple life". He opposed the concept of women working outside the home, woman's clubs, and education for women. He wrote that feminism would lead women to divorce, ill health, and even death. Bok solicited articles against women's rights from former presidents Grover Cleveland and Theodore Roosevelt (though Roosevelt would later change his mind to become a supporter of women's suffrage). Bok viewed suffragists as traitors to their sex, saying "there is no greater enemy of woman than woman herself."

During World War II, the Ladies' Home Journal was a particularly favored venue of the government to place articles intended for homemakers, in an effort to keep up morale and support.

The annual subscription price paid for the production of the magazine and its mailing. The profits came from heavy advertising, pitched to families with above-average incomes of $1000 to $3000 dollars in 1900.  In the 1910s it carried about a third of the advertising in all women's magazines. By 1929 it had nearly twice as much advertising as any other publication except for the Saturday Evening Post, which was also published by the Curtis family. The Ladies' Home Journal  was sold to 2 million subscribers in the mid-1920s, grew a little during the depression years, and surged again during post-World War II prosperity. By 1955, each issue sold 4.6 million copies and there were probably 11 million readers.

Recent history
In March 1970, feminists led by Susan Brownmiller held an 11-hour sit-in at the Ladies' Home Journals office, with some of them sitting on the desk of editor John Mack Carter, smoking his cigars, and asking him to resign and be replaced by a woman editor. Carter declined to resign but he listened to their grievances, and as a result, they were allowed to produce a section of the magazine that August. They wanted the magazine to recognize a wider variety of choices for women's lives, as well as give greater attention to women's issues such as sexual discrimination and abortion. Other activists continued the protests and seem to have achieved some success. They "may not have liberated the Ladies’ Home Journal, but they did help change perceptions of how the media could portray women’s lives", according to one source.  

The Journal, along with its major rivals, Better Homes and Gardens, Family Circle, Good Housekeeping, McCall's, Redbook and Woman's Day, were long known as the "seven sisters", after the prestigious women's colleges in the Northeast.  For decades, the Journal had the greatest circulation of this group, but it fell behind McCall's in 1961.  By 1968, its circulation was 6.8 million compared to McCall's 8.5 million. Society was changing and this was reflected in persons' magazine choices.

That year, Curtis Publishing sold the Ladies' Home Journal, along with the magazine The American Home, to Downe Communications for $5.4 million in stock. Between 1969 and 1974 Downe was acquired by Charter Company. In 1982 it sold the magazine to Family Media Inc., publishers of Health magazine, when Charter decided to divest its publishing interests.

In 1986, the Meredith Corporation acquired the magazine from Family Media for $96 million. By 1998, the Journals circulation had dropped to 4.5 million.

The magazine debuted an extensive visual and editorial redesign in its March 2012 issue. Photographer Brigitte Lacombe was hired to shoot cover photos, with Kate Winslet appearing on the first revamped issue. The Journal announced that portions of its editorial content would be crowdsourced from readers, who would be fairly compensated for their work. The arrangement was one of the first of its kind among major consumer magazines.

Although the magazine remained very popular, it ran into increasing difficulty attracting advertising. Despite its high subscriber base (3.2 million in 2016), it was not a leader in the women's service category. These factors prompted the decision to end monthly publication. The magazine was relaunched as a quarterly. At the same time, the headquarters of the magazine moved from New York City to Des Moines, Iowa. Meredith offered its subscribers the chance to transfer their subscriptions to Meredith's sister publications.

In 2016, Meredith partnered with Grand Editorial to produce Ladies' Home Journal. Only one issue was created.

Features

The most famous cooking teacher of her time, Sarah Tyson Rorer, served as LHJ's first food editor from 1897 to 1911, when she moved to Good Housekeeping.

In 1936, Mary Cookman, wife of New York Post editor Joseph Cookman, began working at the Ladies' Home Journal. In time, she was named its Executive Editor, and she remained with LHJ till 1963. She was known throughout most of her career as Mary Bass. Cookman died in 1991.

In 1946, the Journal adopted the slogan, "Never underestimate the power of a woman," which it continues to use today.

The magazine's trademark feature is “Can This Marriage Be Saved?” In this popular column, each person of a couple in a troubled marriage explains their view of the problem, a marriage counselor explains the solutions offered in counseling, and the outcome is published. It was written for 30 years, starting in 1953, by Dorothy D. MacKaye under the name of Dorothy Cameron Disney.'''  MacKaye co-founded this column with Paul Popenoe, a founding practitioner of marriage counseling in the U.S. The two jointly wrote a book of the same title in 1960. Both the book and the column drew their material from the extensive case files of the American Institute of Family Relations in Los Angeles, California. MacKaye died in 1992 at the age of 88. Subsequent writers for the feature have included Lois Duncan and Margery D. Rosen.

The illustrations of William Ladd Taylor were featured between 1895 and 1926; the magazine also sold reproductions of his works in oil and water-color.

Editors
Louisa Knapp Curtis (1889-1889)
Edward William Bok (1890-1919)
H. O. Davis (1919-1920)
Barton W. Currie (1920-1928)
Loring A. Schuler (1928-1935)
Bruce Gould and Beatrice Gould (1935-1962)
Curtiss Anderson (1962-1964)
Davis Thomas (1964-1965)
John Mack Carter (1965-1973)
Lenore Hershey (1973-1981)
Myrna Blyth (1981-2002)
Diane Salvatore (2002-2008)
Sally Lee (2008-2014)

Writers
Cynthia May Alden
Mary Bass
Eleanor Hoyt Brainerd
Kathryn Casey
Joan Younger Dickinson
Florence Morse Kingsley
Julia Magruder
Isabel Mallon
Helen Reimensnyder Martin
Sylvia Porter
Eben E. Rexford
Gene Shalit
Mark Sullivan
Gladys Taber
Dorothy Thompson
Olivia Mackenzie Zecy

Most recent staff
Sally Lee, Editor-in-Chief
Kate Lawler, Executive Editor
Jeffrey Saks, Creative Director
Margot Gilman, Deputy Editor
Julie Bain, Health Director
Erica Metzger, Beauty Director
Lorraine Glennon, Senior Editor
Louise Sloan, Senior Editor
Sue Owen Erneta, Fashion Editor
Tara Bench, Food and Entertaining Editor
Beth Roehrig, Home Editor
Catherine LeFebvre, Senior Online Editor

Cover gallery

References

Further reading
 Bogardus, Ralph F. "Tea Wars: Advertising Photography and Ideology in the Ladies' Home Journal in the 1890s." Prospects 16 (1991) pp: 297-322.
 Damon-Moore, Helen. Magazines for the millions: Gender and commerce in the Ladies' Home Journal and the Saturday Evening Post, 1880-1910 (SUNY Press, 1994)  online
 Kitch, Carolyn. "The American Woman Series: Gender and Class in The Ladies' Home Journal, 1897." Journalism & Mass Communication Quarterly 75.2 (1998): 243-262.
 Knight, Jan. "The Environmentalism of Edward Bok: The Ladies' Home Journal, the General Federation of Women's Clubs, and the Environment, 1901-09." Journalism History 29.4 (2004): 154.
 Krabbendam, Hans. The Model Man: A Life of Edward William Bok, 1863-1930 (Rodopi, 2001)
 Lewis, W. David. "Edward Bok: the editor as entrepreneur." Essays in Economic & Business History 20 (2012).
 Mott, Frank Luther. A history of American magazines. vol 4. 1885-1905 (Harvard UP, 1957) pp 536–555.  covers Ladies Home Journal.
 Snyder, Beth Dalia. "Confidence women: Constructing female culture and community in" Just Among Ourselves" and the Ladies' Home Journal." American Transcendental Quarterly 12#4 (1998): 311.
 Steinberg, Salme Harju. Reformer in the Marketplace: Edward W. Bok and the Ladies' Home Journal (Louisiana State University Press, 1979)
 Vogel, Dorothy. "'To Put Beauty into the World': Music Education Resources in The Ladies' Home Journal, 1890–1919." Journal of Historical Research in Music Education 34.2 (2013): 119-136.   online
 Ward, Douglas B. "The Geography of the Ladies' Home Journal: An Analysis of a Magazine's Audience, 1911-55." journalism History'' 34.1 (2008): 2+  online
 Ward, Douglas B. "The reader as consumer: Curtis Publishing Company and its audience, 1910-1930." Journalism History 22.2 (1996): 47+   online

External links

Ladies' Home Journal official site
''The Ladies' Home Journal at the HathiTrust
 Online archive of the covers of many early issues

 
Monthly magazines published in the United States
Quarterly magazines published in the United States
Defunct women's magazines published in the United States
Magazines established in 1883
Magazines disestablished in 2016
Meredith Corporation magazines
Magazines published in Iowa
Magazines published in New York City
Mass media in Des Moines, Iowa